Batey Luisa Airport is located in the municipality of Boca Chica, in the Santo Domingo province of the Dominican Republic. It serves to sports air shows and other air facilities that doesn't have any to be with commercial aviation.

See also 
Las Americas International Airport

References

External links 
 

Airports in the Dominican Republic
Buildings and structures in Santo Domingo Province